Parroquia de San Nicolás de Bari is a Catholic church located on Santa Fe Avenue, Retiro neighborhood, Buenos Aires, Argentina.

History 

The Parish of San Nicolás de Bari was established in 1733 by Domingo de Acassuso, founder of San Isidro. Its first priest was Joaquín Sotelo, who was the head of the parish for several years. Some of the priests came from ancient patrician families of Buenos Aires such as Manuel Alberti, member of the Primera Junta, and Eduardo O'Gorman, belonging to the families O'Gorman and Périchon de Vandeuil.

The parish has undergone reconstruction several times, among them the reconstruction by architect Arturo Prins in 1901, work that was demolished in 1931 due to the construction of the 9 de Julio Avenue. The current façade was completed in 1935 by the architect Carlos Messa.

References

External links 
www.parroquiasannicolas.com.ar

19th-century Roman Catholic church buildings in Argentina
Roman Catholic churches completed in 1935
Christianity in Buenos Aires
Buildings and structures in Buenos Aires